Parastasia ephippium is a beetle belonging to the family Scarabaeidae. This species can be found in Malaysia, Borneo, Sumatra, Nias Island and Java.

References
 BioLib
 Universal Biological Indexer

Scarabaeidae
Beetles of Asia
Beetles described in 1864
Taxa named by Samuel Constantinus Snellen van Vollenhoven